Catalin Gard (born 10 July 1981 as Cătălin-Ionuț Gârd) is a Romanian-American tennis player. On February 18, 2008, he reached his highest ATP singles ranking of 224 whilst his highest doubles ranking was 528 achieved on April 20, 2009.

References

External links

1981 births
Living people
Sportspeople from Galați
Romanian male tennis players